Huang Xian or Huangxian may refer to:

 Huang County or Huang Xian, former name of Longkou, a city in Shandong, China
 Huangxian, Fenghua (黄贤村), a village in Qiucun (裘村镇), Fenghua, Zhejiang, China

See also
 , a town in Jiangsu province